Bing Webmaster Tools (previously the Bing Webmaster Center) is a free service as part of Microsoft's Bing search engine which allows webmasters to add their websites to the Bing index crawler, see their site's performance in Bing (clicks, impressions) and a lot more. The service also offers tools for webmasters to troubleshoot the crawling and indexing of their website, submission of new URLs, Sitemap creation, submission and ping tools, website statistics, consolidation of content submission, and new content and community resources.

Features
Bing Webmaster Tools provides many features that can be accessed by webmasters after they verify the ownership of their websites using methods such as MetaTag verification, adding CNAME record to DNS entry, XML verification and Domain Connect.

It contains the following tools and features to support webmasters to access data and manage their websites on Bing:
Submit Urls allows webmasters to submit thousands of URLs present in their website for faster indexing. The number of URLs they can submit can be as much as 10,000 URLs per day.
Crawl issues allows webmasters to discover potential issues with their websites such as File Not Found (404) errors, blocked by REP, long dynamic URLs, and unsupported content-types.
Backlink data allows webmasters to access data about their referring links. Part of this feature was acquired from Yahoo! Site Explorer.
Advanced filtering allows webmasters to quickly scope the results in their website reports to zoom into the data they need.
Data download allows webmasters to access the first 1000 results in a CSV file to analyze the results.
Keyword search tool allows webmasters to explore new keywords.
Robots.txt validator allows webmasters to check if their robots.txt file meets the standard.
Markup validator allows webmasters to check if their site meets W3C standards.
Sitemaps allows webmasters to check if Bing is viewing their sitemap correctly.
Outbound links allows webmasters to see the outbound links Bing sees.

See also
Windows Live
Microsoft Bing
Google Search Console

References

External links
Bing Webmaster Tools
Bing
Bing Webmaster Tools official blog
Bing Webmaster Center official forum

Webmaster Tools
Search engine webmaster tools
Internet properties established in 2009